The William A. Rogers House is a historic house in Eutaw, Alabama.  The one-story wood-frame house was built in stages from the late 1840s to the 1850s.  It features Greek Revival-style architecture, with a pedimented tetrastyle portico fronting the central three bays of the five-bay main facade.  It was added to the National Register of Historic Places as part of the Antebellum Homes in Eutaw Thematic Resource on April 2, 1982.

References

National Register of Historic Places in Greene County, Alabama
Houses on the National Register of Historic Places in Alabama
Houses in Greene County, Alabama
Greek Revival houses in Alabama